The 1972 United States presidential election in Hawaii took place on November 7, 1972. All 50 states and the District of Columbia, were part of the 1972 United States presidential election. Hawaii voters chose 4 electors to the Electoral College, which selected the president and vice president.

Hawaii was won by incumbent United States President Richard Nixon of California, who was running against Senator George McGovern of South Dakota. Nixon ran for a second time with former Governor Spiro Agnew of Maryland, and McGovern ran with former U.S. Ambassador to France Sargent Shriver of Maryland.

Nixon won the election in Hawaii with a decisive 25-point landslide, with a clear majority in all four counties. Nixon was the first Republican to win the state of Hawaii and the only one until Ronald Reagan won the state in 1984. Hawaii’s result was 1.76% more Republican than the nation-at-large. This marks the only time in which Hawaii voted to the right of Alaska. It is also the only time in the state's history that a Republican has won over 60% of the state's vote, or has even won 60% of the vote in any of the state's counties. This was the first of three times in which Oahu supported the Republican candidate for President.

Results

See also
 Watergate scandal

References

Hawaii
1972
1972 Hawaii elections